Clarke Alonzo "Pinky" Pittenger [previously thought to be Pittinger] (February 24, 1899 – November 4, 1977) was a reserve infielder/outfielder in Major League Baseball, playing mainly at shortstop for three different teams between the  and  seasons. He was born in Hudson, Michigan.

A valuable utility man, Pittenger was 22 years old when he entered the majors in 1921 with the Boston Red Sox, playing for them through 1923 before joining the Chicago Cubs (1925) and Cincinnati Reds (1927–1929). His most productive season came with the 1929 Reds, when he posted career-numbers in games (77), runs (31) and RBI (27), while hitting a .295 batting average, also a career-high.

In a seven-season career, Pittenger was a .263 hitter (252-for-373) with one home run and 83 RBI in 373 games, including 118 runs, 32 doubles, three triples and 27 stolen bases. He made 284 infield appearances at shortstop (136), third base (77) and second (71), and also played 21 games at left field (18),  center (4) and right (4) .

Pittenger died at the age of 78 in Fort Lauderdale, Florida.

External links

MLB historical statistics
Retrosheet

Boston Red Sox players
Chicago Cubs players
Cincinnati Reds players
Major League Baseball infielders
Major League Baseball outfielders
Baseball players from Michigan
1899 births
1977 deaths
People from Hudson, Michigan